Tryphon of Vyatka (c. 1546–1612) was a Russian abbot and saint.

Tryphon was born in the village of Malaya Nemnyuzhka (Malaya Nemnyuga or Malonemnyuzhskoye (Voskresenskoye)) of Pinezhsky district (now the village Sovpolye, Mezensky District, Arkhangelsk Oblast), in the family of a wealthy peasant Dimitry Podvizev.

He is known for evangelizing to the Ostyaks, and founded a monastery in Vyatka.

He was canonized by the Russian Orthodox Church in 1903, his feast day is October 12.

Russian saints
People from Vyatka Governorate
1540s births
1612 deaths